Strikeforce: Four Men Enter, One Man Survives (also called the Strikeforce Tournament Series) was a mixed martial arts event held at the HP Pavilion in San Jose, California on November 16, 2007. The event was hosted by Strikeforce in conjunction with bodogFight, and was streamed live on Yahoo! Sports. The event held two distinctions in that: 1) it contained the first MMA tournament sanctioned by the California State Athletic Commission and 2) Strikeforce's heavyweight champion was determined during the event in a non-tournament fight.

Tournament Rules
The tournament was a four-man, single-elimination tournament. Each bracket consisted of two five-minute rounds, with a third round being fought in the case of a tie.

Results

Middleweight Tournament Results

See also
 Strikeforce
 List of Strikeforce champions
 List of Strikeforce events
 2007 in Strikeforce

References

External links
Strikeforce Official website
bodogFIGHT Official Website

Four Men Enter, One Man Survives
2007 in mixed martial arts
Mixed martial arts in San Jose, California
2007 in sports in California